The Mariana Islands consist of two jurisdictions of the United States: the Commonwealth of the Northern Mariana Islands and, at the southern end of the chain, the territory of Guam. As of December 31, 2021, the LDS Church reported 2,534 members in one stake, five congregations (four wards and one branch), one mission, and one temple in Guam. There are 897 members in a ward in the Northern Mariana Islands. There are two family history centers, one in Guam and one at the Saipan Ward building in the Northern Mariana Islands.

History

Guam
The first known members on Guam was during World War II. From 1944 to 1945, servicemen's groups numbering 50-300 existed on Guam. In 1946, families were allowed to accompany servicemen and all servicemen's groups on the island were consolidated to one. The Guam Branch became part of the Honolulu Stake in 1959. On March 3, 1970, the Guam Branch became a ward in the Honolulu Stake.

Full-time missionary work began in July 1970 when two missionaries arrived from the Hawaiian Mission. On November 21, 1971, the Honolulu Stake was divided due to size and the ward became part of the newly created Kaneohe Stake. The first Chamorro couple to join the church was baptized on May 21, 1977. In 1989, portions of the Book of Mormon were translated into Chamorro. Also in 1989, Herbert J. Leddy became the first member to become District President. On January 31, 2000, President Gordon B. Hinckley visited Guam. He was welcomed by then-Governor Carl Gutierrez and 684 church members. On December 12, 2010, the Barigada Guam Stake was formed. As of January 2021, this stake has five wards, one branch on Guam, one ward in the Northern Mariana Islands, two branches in Yap and one branch in Micronesia.

In 2020, during the COVID-19 outbreak, the church made multiple donations to Guam. Beginning in May, missionaries from the Micronesia Guam Mission and LDS Humanitarian Services donated a large amount of food to the Catholic Agana Archdiocese Ministry to the Homeless. On July 24, Eric Hicks, president of the Micronesia Guam Mission (MGM), and seven missionaries helped the Ministry reorganize the cafeteria back from a supply room to a serving area. Also in May, the church made food donations for the Salvation Army Guam Corps. Starting in May, those serving in the MGM began volunteering weekly at The Salvation Army to organize the donations. LDS Humanitarian Services has made two donations to a local organization called Kadu Care-Givers.

Saipan

American servicemen's groups were set up to serve members in Saipan during World War II (1944 and 1945). One of these servicemen was L. Tom Perry. After World War II, military presence remained on the island and servicemen's groups existed off and on until full-time missionaries arrived on the island in 1975.

The first convert in Saipan was Juanita Augustine, from Palau, who was baptized on July 16, 1975.  Later that year, a dependent branch was formed on the island. This became an independent branch on January 24, 1976. In 1980, the Saipan branch had 85 members. The branch became part of the Guam District on April 18, 1982.

Rota 
Missionaries assigned to Rota arrived on September 5, 1986. Since then, missionaries have made infrequent trips to Rota and members attend church in Saipan.

Tinian
A few members moved to the island and in March 1990, the San Jose branch was formed as part of the Guam District.  Full-time missionaries arrived on August 14, 1992. The branch was discontinued in 1997. Since then, missionaries have made infrequent trips to Rota and members attend church in Saipan. The Church donated more than $1,000 to the Red Cross and volunteers during the aftermath of Typhoon Yutu which made landfall on October 25, 2018.

Stake and Congregations
The Barrigada Guam Stake consists of 5 Wards and 4 Branches in Guam, Northern Marianna Islands, Yap (Micronesia), and Palau as of February 2023.
Barrigada Ward (Guam)
Colonia Branch (Yap)
Dededo Ward (Guam)
Koror Branch (Palau)
Saipan Ward (Northern Marianna Islands)
Talisay Ward (Guam)
Talofofo Branch (Guam)
Thol Branch (Yap)
Yigo Ward (Guam)

Missions

The Micronesia/Guam Mission covers Guam, the Northern Marianna Islands, Micronesia, and Palau.

Temples

Groundbreaking for the Yigo Guam Temple was on September 1, 2019, by David A. Bednar.

See also

Religion in Guam
Religion in Yap
Religion in the Northern Mariana Islands
Religion in Palau

References

External links
 Mormon Church of Guam Guampedia
 The Church of Jesus Christ of Latter-day Saints - Official Site (English)
 The Church of Jesus Christ of Latter-day Saints - Official Site (Pacific)
 The Church of Jesus Christ of Latter-day Saints Newsroom - Guam & Micronesia (Also Northern Marianna Islands & Palau)
 ComeUntoChrist.org Latter-day Saints Visitor site

 
The Church of Jesus Christ of Latter-day Saints in Oceania